Adee is both a surname and a given name. Notable people with the name include:

Alvey A. Adee (1842–1924), American diplomat
Bill Adee, American journalist
George Adee (1874–1948), American football player and tennis official
Adee Dodge (1912–1992), Navajo artist, linguist, and Navajo code talker
Adee Phelan (born 1974), British hairdresser

Feminine given names